The Idea of North are an Australian a cappella vocal ensemble founded in Canberra in 1993, by Nick Begbie (tenor), Meg Corson (alto), Trish Delaney-Brown (soprano) and Andrew Piper (bass). In March 2002 Corson was replaced as alto by Naomi Crellin. Delaney-Brown was replaced on soprano in February 2007 by Sally Cameron. They won the Best Jazz Album category at the ARIA Music Awards of 2010 for Feels Like Spring (collaboration with James Morrison) and again in 2013 for Smile.

History

1993-1999: formation and debut album
The Idea of North were formed as a jazz-based, a cappella quartet, in Canberra in 1993, by Nick Begbie (tenor), Meg Corson (alto), Trish Delaney-Brown (soprano) and Andrew Piper (bass). All four members were students at the Canberra School of Music of Australian National University. The group's name is from The Idea of North (1967), a radio documentary by Canadian classical pianist, Glenn Gould. The group are generally described as a jazz quartet, but they also sing pop, R&B, classical, folk, soul and gospel. They cover material by the Beatles, Peter Allen, the Muppets, Aretha Franklin and Bee Gees.

In 1997 they issued their debut album, The Idea of North,  with Ra Khan producing at the Canberra School of Music's recording studios. The group members arranged cover versions of both traditional and more recent material. Instrumentation was provided by Greg Stott on congas and percussion on three tracks and Piper on flugelhorn on "My Funny Valentine". In 1999 they collaborated with jazz musician, James Morrison, and country singer, Gina Jeffreys, to record a cover version of "Blue Christmas" which appears on Jeffreys' album, Christmas Wish (November 1999). Morrison felt the ensemble were "the best contemporary a cappella group in the country."

2000-2005: The Sum of Us, Here & Now & Evidence
The Idea of North's second album, The Sum of Us was released in October 2001, its track, "Mas Que Nada", features Morrison on trombone and another track, "Fragile", showcases Don Burrows on flute. Delaney-Brown wrote two tracks, "Neat Surprise" and "Gotta Move On", while "Singin a Capella" was co-written by Begbie and Piper and "Two Sides to the Story" was written by Piper. It was co-produced by the group's members and recorded at Tiger Studios, Sydney for Magnetic Records. It reached No. 15 on the ARIA Jazz & Blues Albums chart.

In March 2002 Corson was replaced as alto in the group by Naomi Crellin (ex-Pure Harmony), a graduate from University of Adelaide's Elder Conservatorium. Corson started her solo career; during 2014 she teamed with Stott on guitar as a musical duo. Crellin's previous group, Pure Harmony, are an a capella quartet formed in 1992 at Marryatville High School, Adelaide with fellow students Sally Cameron and Joy Hague.

The Idea of North's third album, Here & Now, was released in October 2003 via ABC Jazz, which has re-recordings of their previous material plus two new tracks. The line-up of Begbie, Crellin, Delaney-Brown and Piper recorded it at Australian Broadcasting Corporation's studio 227, Sydney. It reached No. 13 on the ARIA Hitseekers Albums Chart and No. 8 on the ARIA Jazz & Blues Albums chart.

San Francisco-based, Contemporary A Cappella Society, present the Contemporary A Cappella Recording Awards. In 2004 the Idea of North were runners up for Artist of the Year.

In May 2004, The Idea of North's released Evidence. Evidence peaked at No. 12 on the ARIA Jazz & Blues Albums chart. At the 2005 Contemporary A Cappella Recording Awards they won best jazz album and best jazz song for "Rachel".

2006-2009: The Gospel Project & Live at the Powerhouse
In April 2006, The Idea of North released The Gospel Project, and featured prayers and three tracks, "Let It Ring", "Help Us" and "The Truth" co-written by Begbie and Michael Leunig. Aside from vocals by Begbie, Crellin, Delaney-Brown and Piper four of the recordings included instrumentals: Duncan Brown on bass guitar, Bill Risby on keyboards and Gordon Rytmeister on drums. During 2006 they had appeared at festivals in Germany, Japan, Malaysia and South Korea. In October they toured Australia to promote the album with the Gospel Project Band.

On 2 July 2007 they issued their first live album, Live at the Powerhouse, both on CD and as a DVD. Barry O'Sullivan of All About Jazz described how the "a capella vocal ensemble just swings and swings with impeccable harmonies and an understanding of each others' vocal parts. The breadth of the group's performance is its most remarkable characteristic, never stopping in offering something new with tracks." The album was recorded at the Brisbane Powerhouse on 4 June 2006 with the DVD directed and edited by Adam Sébire, while the audio was recorded by David Hemming and produced by the group.

Sally Cameron (ex-Pure Harmony, South Australian Police Band) joined as soprano in February 2007 to replace Delaney-Brown, who left to start her family. The group farewelled Delaney-Brown, formally, in a one-off concert at The Basement, Sydney in June 2008. She later became a member of Sonic Mayhem Orchestra and then James Valentine Quartet before establishing the Trish Delaney-Brown Quintet.

2010-2011: Feels Like Spring & Extraordinary Tale
On 10 April 2010, The group released their sixth studio album, Feels Like Spring which, another collaboration with Morrison, peaked at No. 3 on the ARIA Jazz & Blues Albums chart and spent 33 weeks (non-consecutive) in the top 20 until February 2011. In the studio, instrumentation was supplied by Begbie on tenor saxophone and trombone; Brown on bass guitar; Cameron on alto saxophone and trumpet; Ian Cooper on strings; Sandro Constatino on viola; Crellin on alto saxophone and trumpet; Alexandra D'ella on violin; Phillip Hartl on violin; Morrison on double bass, flugelhorn, horn arrangements, piano, saxophone, trombone and trumpet; James Muller on guitar; Piper on bass guitar, baritone saxophone and trombone; Rytmeister on drums; Sunnil de Silva on percussion; Adrian Wallis on cello; and Jonathan Zwartz on double bass. It was co-produced by the group and Morrison.

At the ARIA Music Awards of 2010 Idea of North and James Morrison won the ARIA Award for Best Jazz Album for Feels Like Spring.

In July 2011, the group released Extraordinary Tale. At the ARIA Music Awards of 2011 the ensemble were nominated for Best Jazz Album. For the solely a capella recording Begbie, Cameron, Crellin and Piper provided their usual four part harmony with Piper adding vocal percussion. Extraordinary Tale peaked at No. 1 on the ARIA Jazz & Blues Albums, No. 5 on the Hitseekers Albums and No. 93 on the Top 100 Physical Albums charts. Also in 2011 Crellin temporarily left, on maternity leave, and was replaced on alto by Joy Hague (ex-Pure Harmony) with Crellin returning in the following year. Hague resumed her work as a high school music teacher although she filled in as deputy alto in the Idea of North as required thereafter.

2012-2014: This Christmas and Smile
The quartet recorded their eighth studio album, This Christmas, which was released on 29 October 2012. The album includes Morrison guesting on trombone on two tracks and Hague as alto on three tracks. The album peaked at No. 80 on the ARIA Albums, No. 2 on the Hitseekers Albums and No. 2 on the Jazz & Blues Albums charts.

The quartet's ninth studio album, Smile, was released on 12 August 2013 which peaked at No. 86 on the ARIA Albums, No. 4 on the Hitseekers Albums and No. 2 on the Jazz & Blues Albums charts.

At the ARIA Music Awards of 2013 the Idea of North won the ARIA Award for Best Jazz Album for a second time with Smile.

In November 2014, the Idea of North released a compilation album, Anthology, which peaked at No. 5 on the Jazz & Blues Albums charts.

2015-present: Ballads and Brick By Brick
From 2016, Japanese vocal percussionist Kaichiro Kitamura was a session and touring member and featured on three tracks on their tenth studio album, Ballads, which was released on 18 April 2016. The album reached No. 3 on the Hitseekers Albums and No. 2 on the Jazz & Blues Albums charts.

In February 2017, Cameron and Piper both left the group; Piper was replaced on bass by Luke Thompson while Cameron's temporary replacements were Delaney-Brown and Jo Lawry prior to a more permanent soprano to be appointed later that year.

In November 2018, the group self-released Brick By Brick, available from their website.

Members

Current
Tenor: Nick Begbie (1993–present)
Soprano: Trish Delaney-Brown (1993–2007, 2017), Jo Lawry (2017), Emma Rule (2018)
Alto: Naomi Crellin (2002–11, 2012–present)  
Bass: Luke Thompson (2017–present)

Touring and session
Vocal percussion: Kaichiro Kitamura (2016–present)

Former
Alto: Meg Corson (1993–2002)
Bass: Andrew Piper (1993–2017)
Alto: Joy Hague (2011–12)
Soprano: Sally Cameron (2007–17)

Discography

Studio albums

Live albums

As featured albums

Compilation albums

Awards and nominations

ARIA Awards
The ARIA Music Awards are presented annually since 1987 by the Australian Recording Industry Association (ARIA). The Idea of North has won one award from four nominations.

 

|-
| 2010 || Feels Like Spring  || rowspan="4"| ARIA Award for Best Jazz Album || 
|-
| 2011 || Extraordinary Tale ||  
|-
| 2013 || Smile ||  
|-
| 2016 || Ballads ||  
|-
| 2017 || A Piece of Quiet (The Hush Collection, Vol. 16)  || ARIA Award for Best Children's Album || 
|}

CARA Awards
Since 1992, the annual Contemporary A Cappella Recording Awards (CARAs) recognise the best recorded a cappella and aim to support this burgeoning culture of instrument-less enthusiasts.

|-
| rowspan="2"| 2005 || Evidence || Best Jazz Album ||  
|-
|| "Rachel" || Best Jazz Song ||  
|-
| 2010 || The Idea of North || Favourite Oceanic Group ||  
|-
| 2011 || The Idea of North || Favourite Oceanic Group ||  
|-
| 2013 || The Idea of North || Favourite Oceanic Group ||  
|}

Note:wins only

References

External links
Official website
Contemporary A Cappella Society

ARIA Award winners
Australian Capital Territory musical groups
Australian vocal groups
Australian jazz ensembles
Professional a cappella groups
Vocal quartets
Vocal jazz ensembles